The 2001 Colonial Athletic Association baseball tournament was held at Coy Tillett Sr. Memorial Field in Manteo, North Carolina, from May 15 through 19.  The event determined the champion of the Colonial Athletic Association for the 2001 season.  Second-seeded  won the tournament for the first time and earned the CAA's automatic bid to the 2001 NCAA Division I baseball tournament.

Entering the event, East Carolina had won the most championships, with seven.  Old Dominion and Richmond had each won three, while George Mason had won twice.

Format and seeding
The CAA's eligible teams were seeded one to six based on winning percentage from the conference's round robin regular season.  They played a double-elimination tournament.  East Carolina and Richmond were ineligible for the Conference Tournament as they prepared to leave the CAA.

Bracket and results

Most Valuable Player
Mike O'Kelly was named Tournament Most Valuable Player.  O'Kelly was a first baseman for William & Mary.

References

Tournament
Colonial Athletic Association Baseball Tournament
Colonial Athletic Association baseball tournament
Colonial Athletic Association baseball tournament
Baseball in North Carolina
College sports in North Carolina
Sports competitions in North Carolina
Tourist attractions in Dare County, North Carolina